SteamOS is a Linux distribution developed by Valve. It is open source with some closed source components and is the primary operating system for Steam Machines and the Steam Deck. 

The initial versions of SteamOS, versions 1.0 and 2.0, were based on the Debian distribution of Linux. SteamOS was originally built to support streaming of video games from one personal computer to the one running SteamOS within the same network, though the operating system can support standalone systems and was intended to be used as part of Valve's Steam Machine platform. With SteamOS, Valve encouraged developers to incorporate Linux compatibility into their releases to better support Linux gaming options.

In July 2021, Valve announced the Steam Deck, a handheld gaming computer. It runs SteamOS 3.0, which is based on the Arch Linux distribution with a KDE Plasma 5 desktop, rather than the Debian base with GNOME desktop used for earlier versions of SteamOS.

Features 
SteamOS is designed primarily for playing video games away from a PC (such as from the couch in one's living room) by providing a console-like experience using generic PC hardware that can connect directly to a television. It can run games natively that have been developed for Linux and purchased from the Steam store. Users are also able to stream games from their Windows, Mac or Linux computers to one running SteamOS, and it incorporates the same family sharing and restrictions as Steam on the desktop. Valve claims that it has "achieved significant performance increases in graphics processing" through SteamOS. The operating system is open source, allowing users to build on or adapt the source code, though the actual Steam client is closed.

Since SteamOS is solely for playing games without a mouse or keyboard, it does not have many built-in functions beyond web browsing and playing games. Users can, however, access the KDE Plasma 5 desktop environment and perform tasks such as installing other software. Though the OS does not currently support streaming services, Valve historically considered integration with Spotify and Netflix. However, Steam does have full-length films from indie movie makers available from their store. The OS natively supports Nvidia, Intel, and AMD graphics processors.

Valve stated that it has added support for movies, television, and music to SteamOS. However, video content is only available from Steam's store, which has a small number of films. Music playback only supports local music collections. In October 2015, an update allowed Netflix and other DRM protected content to function in the native built-in browser.

The current system hardware requirements for default SteamOS installations include:
 Intel or AMD 64-bit capable processor
 At least 4 GB of RAM
 At least 200 GB on one’s hard disk
 NVIDIA (Fermi graphics cards (GeForce 400 series and GeForce 500 series) or newer), Intel, or AMD graphics card (RADEON 8500 or newer)
 USB port for installation
 UEFI boot support 
A custom installer method is also available, which can require additional configuration steps. This method allows for smaller hard-disk sizes. There is also an ISO image installer that supports legacy BIOS motherboard. The installers can be sourced through Valve's repository.

Development 
During a panel at LinuxCon on September 16, 2013, Valve co-founder and executive director Gabe Newell stated that he believed "Linux and open source are the future of gaming", going on to say that the company was aiding game developers who want to make games compatible with Linux, and that they would be making an announcement the following week related to introducing Linux into the living room. On September 20, 2013, Valve posted a statement on its website titled The Steam Universe is Expanding in 2014 which teased three new announcements related to "even more ways to connect the dots for customers who want Steam in the living-room". The first announcement was made on September 23 as SteamOS, with Valve saying they had "come to the conclusion that the environment best suited to delivering value to customers is an operating system built around Steam itself". A large focus of the reveal was the openness of the operating system, with it being announced that users would be able to alter or replace any part of the software, and that it would be free.

In October 2013, Valve announced Steam Dev Days; a two-day developer conference where video game developers could test and provide feedback on SteamOS and Steam Machines. In October 2013, Nvidia also announced their collaboration with Valve to support  SteamOS with the help of a development suite called Nvidia GameWorks which incorporates PhysX, OptiX, VisualFX and other Nvidia-proprietary APIs and implementations thereof.

In November 2013, Valve confirmed that they would not be making any exclusive games for SteamOS, and discouraged other developers from doing so, as it goes against their philosophy of selling games wherever customers are. In December, Valve announced that a beta version of SteamOS would be released on December 13, 2013. When this beta version released, Valve encouraged customers unfamiliar with Linux to wait until 2014.

In mid-October 2015, preorders of the Steam Controller, Steam Link, and Alienware branded Steam Machines became available. The official release date for Steam Machines was on November 10, 2015.

On July 15, 2021, Valve announced the Steam Deck, a brand new handheld PC gaming device. The Steam Deck runs a customized version of Steam OS 3.0 that is based upon Arch Linux, with the desktop mode being powered by KDE Plasma 5. The decision to move from Debian to Arch Linux was based on the different update schedule for these distributions. Debian, geared for server configurations, has its core software update in one large package with intermediate patches for known bug and security fixes, while Arch uses a rolling update approach for all parts. Valve found that the rolling update approach would be better suited for the Steam Deck, allowing them to address issues and fixes much faster than Debian would allow. Valve affirmed that SteamOS 3.0 will continue to be freely available, with the intention of allowing other hardware developers to take advantage of it and build similar handheld computing devices like the Deck.

Releases

Performance

SteamOS 1.0 beta 
In December 2013, Phoronix compared three Nvidia graphics cards on SteamOS 1.0 beta and Windows 8.1 Pro. Overall, Nvidia's proprietary Linux graphics driver delivered performance comparable to that of the Windows drivers due to the platforms’ largely shared codebase.

In January 2014, GameSpot compared the performance of three games (Dota 2, Left 4 Dead 2, and Metro: Last Light) running on Windows 7 x64 and SteamOS 1.0 beta. With an AMD graphics card, they found that all ran at considerably fewer frames per second on SteamOS, and Left 4 Dead 2 stuttered, which they attributed to a device driver problem. With an Nvidia graphics card, they found that Metro: Last Light ran at a slightly higher frame rate and Dota 2 broke even. With both video card brands, Left 4 Dead 2 and Dota 2 had longer load times on SteamOS.

SteamOS 2 
When Steam Machines was officially released in November 2015, Ars Technica compared the rendering performance of cross-platform games on SteamOS 2 and Windows 10 running on the same machine, using average frame-per-second measurements, and found that games rendered between 21% and 58% slower on SteamOS 2. Ars Technica suggested this might be due to the inexperience of developers optimizing on OpenGL in contrast to DirectX, and believed that the performance might improve with future titles. They noted that their benchmark test, using six games on a single computer, was far from comprehensive.

SteamOS 3 
In March 2022, Linus Tech Tips compared SteamOS 3 performance against Windows 10 on the Steam Deck using three gaming benchmarks (including Hitman 3, Doom Eternal, and Elden Ring) which showed that all three titles have an average higher frames per second on SteamOS 3. Hitman 3 delivered a 19 fps average for Windows 10 and a 34 fps average for SteamOS 3. In Doom Eternal, SteamOS 3 hit a 60 fps average while Windows hit a 47 fps average. Elden Ring on SteamOS topping out at 37 fps average while running on Windows 10 at a 30 fps average.

Reception
Following SteamOS’ initial announcement, many video game developers expressed enthusiasm. Minecraft creator Markus Persson described it as "amazing news," and Thomas Was Alone developer Mike Bithell called it "encouraging" for indie games. Other developers such as DICE, creators of the Battlefield series, and The Creative Assembly, developers of the Total War series, stated that they may add Linux support for their games following SteamOS’ release.

On the operating system front, Gearbox Software head Randy Pitchford expressed a belief that the operating system needed a unique application to attract developers, saying "without that must-buy product driving us all towards this stuff, I expect that the industry at large will watch curiously, but remain largely unaffected." Richard Stallman, former president of the Free Software Foundation, expressed cautious support, but does not condone the use of non-free games or DRM.

The SteamOS beta release received mixed reviews. In TechRadar's review Henry Winchester praised the easy to navigate interface and future potential but criticized the hard installation and lack of extra features compared to the Steam software. Eurogamer's Thomas Morgan did not experience installation problems, but commented negatively on the lack of options available for detecting monitor resolutions and audio output, in addition to the lack of games available natively on the operating system. However, he responded well to the user interface, calling it "a positive start".

Since then, outlets such as Ars Technica have revisited the SteamOS since its initial debut, offering observations on the platform's growth, pros, and cons. Both Falcon Northwest and Origin PC, computer manufacturers that were planning on offering Steam Machine hardware, opted to not ship a SteamOS-enabled machine in 2015 due to limitations of SteamOS over Windows; Falcon Northwest said they would still consider shipping machines with SteamOS in the future if performance improves.

See also 

 Linux gaming

References

External links 
 

2013 software
Arch-based Linux distributions
Debian-based distributions
Free software operating systems
Linux distributions
OS
X86-64 Linux distributions
Game console operating systems
2022 software